The UK Video Charts named the top-selling DVDs in the United Kingdom for each week in 2004.

External links
British Video Association
Top 40 Videos Chart at The Official Charts Company
Archive of number-ones at The Official Charts Company
The Official Charts Company (OCC)

United Kingdom DVDs
2004 in British cinema